The Hanseatic League was a trading alliance in northern Europe in existence between the 13th and 17th centuries.

Hanseatic may also refer to:
 Hanseatic (class), upper-class people of the free imperial cities Hamburg, Bremen and Lübeck since mid-17th century after the end of the Hanseatic league
 MS Hanseatic, a cruise ship operated by Hanseatic Tours 1993–1997 and by Hapag–Lloyd Cruises 1997 onwards
 SS Hanseatic (1930), an ocean liner operated by Hamburg Atlantic Line 1958–1966
 SS Hanseatic (1964), an ocean liner/cruise ship operated by German Atlantic Line 1967–1973
 SS Hanseatic (1969), a cruise ship operated by German Atlantic Line 1973

See also
 Hanseatic Parliament, an association of business chambers around the Baltic Sea, founded in the early 1990s
 Hanseatic Tours, a German cruise line that operated 1991–1997